δ-Viniferin is a resveratrol dehydrodimer. It is an isomer of epsilon-viniferin. It can be isolated from stressed grapevine (Vitis vinifera) leaves. It is also found in plant cell cultures and wine. It can also be found in Rheum maximowiczii.

It is a grapevine phytoalexin following stresses like fungal infection (by Plasmopara viticola, the agent of downy mildew), UV light irradiation or ozone treatment.

Botryosphaeria obtusa, a pathogen responsible for the black dead arm disease of grapevine, has also been shown to be able to oxidise wood δ-resveratrol into delta-viniferin.

In cell cultures, the use of methyl jasmonate and jasmonic acid as elicitors stimulates δ-viniferin biosynthesis.

Delta-viniferin can also be produced from resveratrol by human PTGS1 (COX-1, cyclooxygenase-1) or from trans-resveratrol and (−)-epsilon-viniferin by horseradish peroxidase.

See also 
 Phenolic content in wine
 Viniferin (disambiguous)
 alpha-Viniferin
 epsilon-Viniferin
 R-Viniferin
 R2-Viniferin

References

External links 
 Stilbenoids isolated from Vitis vinifera at Schroeder group website

Resveratrol oligomers
Stilbenoid dimers
Phytoalexins
Oxygen heterocycles
Heterocyclic compounds with 2 rings